An Oral History of British Science is an oral history project conducted by National Life Stories at the British Library.  The project began in 2009 with funding from the Arcadia Fund, the Royal Commission for the Exhibition of 1851 and a number of other private donors and focuses on audio interviews with British science and engineering figures.

Project background
The project focused on 200 video interviews lasting 8–15 hours, with four themes: Made in Britain, A Changing Planet, Cosmologies and Biomedicine.   The project Advisory Committee consists of Jon Agar, Alec Broers, Tilly Blyth, Georgina Ferry, Dame Julia Higgins, Maja Kominko, Sir Harry Kroto, John Lynch, Chris Rapley and Simone Turchetti.

An Oral History of British Science is conducted by National Life Stories (NLS) at the British Library, and forms part of a wider institutional initiative to better document contemporary history of science and technology through the addition of audio visual sources as well as written sources.

The case for the project 
Despite a significant oral history tradition in science studies in other countries, the field in Britain is not well developed.  In April 2005 NLS hosted an exploratory roundtable conference at the British Library.  Chaired by Sir Nicholas Goodison, ‘Personal Testimonies of Contemporary Science, Technology and Medicine’ was attended by representatives of the UK’s leading history of science archives and libraries, and distinguished researchers.  The meeting concluded that very few scientific testimonies were held collectively and that a major programme of recording needed to be initiated to capture rich personal memory not available in any printed or manuscript sources. Following this, NLS commissioned a mapping and scoping study. The study confirmed that there were currently very few oral history collections in Britain looking specifically at professionals working in science and technology; that those projects that were developed in the past were short-lived and narrow in scope; and that many of these recordings are not properly archived or publicly accessible. The scoping study found one exception, which was that the history of medicine seemed to be better documented through oral history than other fields of science and technology.

Methodology 
An Oral History of British Science follows the biographical, or life story, oral history approach with each audio interview averaging 8 to 15 hours in length.  This biographical approach is valuable for researchers seeking a more rounded view of an individual and their contribution.  The interviews cover the individual’s career history, education, background and family.

In addition to the life story audio interviews a number of supplementary, follow-up video interviews are being conducted; these focus on particular instrumentation, specific geographical settings or key turning points in a scientist’s career.  Edited extracts from the videos are being made available via the British Library YouTube Channel.   The Vega Science Trust have conducted similar interviews since 1997; they provide access to short interviews with scientists, as well as access to science documentaries, lectures and educational videos, via their website and YouTube channel.

Access to interviews 
All interviews are catalogued on the Sound and Moving Image Catalogue.  Interviews which are complete and open are accessible onsite at the Library in St Pancras, London and in Boston Spa, Yorkshire via the Library’s Listening & Viewing Service.   Interviews which are open are also made accessible via the Archival Sound Recordings website under the ‘Oral history of British science’ content package.

Project strands 

‘A Changing Planet’ considers the advancement of the earth system sciences in the light of recent concerns associated with environmental and climate change.  Two chief points are explored: how, when and why the Earth has become a subject of scientific investigation; and how this investigation has been pivotal to the rise of concerns about the impact of humans on the environments.  Those interviewed for the strand are those involved in the earth sciences: climatologists, meteorologists, geologists, geophysicists, geochemists, ecologists, glaciologists and oceanographers.

‘Made in Britain’ examines important discoveries in science and technology that have led to new industrial applications.  The strand covers computing, aerospace engineering, some applied sciences (such as condensed matter physics) as well as engineering fields (chemical, electrical, civil and structural).  The title refers to the fact that an analysis of these breakthroughs in science should also be looked at as something that has boosted national pride, while arising from research conducted by experts of different ethnic backgrounds.

‘Biomedicine’ aims to investigate the transformations that have typified biomedicine, paying special attention to how new technologies have changed medical practices and provided a new understanding of biological objects.  This strand investigates the industrialisation of the processes of treatment and cure, as well as the idea that these processes can be engineered.  Advances in genetic engineering are central to this study, especially in relation to the rise of ‘big Pharma’.  This strand is currently unfunded.

‘Cosmologies’ considers new systems of thought that have emerged in correspondence with the development of a number of theoretical fields: mathematics, mathematical physics, cosmology, astronomy, statistics, and high-energy physics. This strand is currently unfunded.

People interviewed 

Interviewed for ‘A Changing Planet’:
 Barbara Bowen (Geophysics technician/ research assistant)
 Joe Farman (Geophysicist)
 John Glen (Glaciologist)
 A.T. (Dick) Grove (Geographer/ geomorphologist)
 David Jenkinson (Soil Scientist)
 Desmond King-Hele (Physicist)
 John Kington (Meteorologist and climatologist)
 James Lovelock (Geochemist)
 Melvyn Mason (Technician in seismic refraction)
 Dan McKenzie (geophysicist)
 Stephen Moorbath (Geologist and Geochronologist)
 John Nye (scientist) (Physicist, Theoretical glaciologist)
 Charles Swithinbank (Glaciologist)
 Janet Thomson (Geologist)
 Sue Vine (Geophysicist technician/ research assistant)
 Richard West (Botanist and Quaternary Geologist)

Interviewed for ‘Made in Britain’:
 Raymond Bird (Computer Engineer)
 Tony Brooker (Computer Scientist)
 Mary Coombs (Computer Programmer)
 Sir Alan Cottrell (Metallurgist and Physicist)
 Dai Edwards (Computer Engineer);
 Roy Gibson (Aerospace Engineer)
 Andy Hopper (Computer Engineer)
 Frank Land (Computer Scientist)
 Bob Parkinson (Aerospace Engineer)
 Dame Stephanie Shirley (Computer Scientist)
 Geoff Tootill (Computer Engineer)
 Maurice Wilkes (Computer Engineer)

Interviewed under ‘Biomedicine’:
 Sammy Lee (scientist) (Clinical embryologist)

References

External links 
Oral History of British Science interviews available online
Oral History of British Science
The Arcadia Fund
The 1851 Royal Commission

 
Science education in the United Kingdom
Oral history
British Library collections
History of science
National Life Stories